Achilleas Constantinou (born 1948) is a British businessman and the co-founder, with his late brother Aristos Constantinou, of the Ariella fashion label.

Early life
Constantinou was born in 1948. He was educated at Arnos Secondary Modern School, Southgate, London, followed by Waltham Forest Technical College, and King's College London, from where he graduated with an LLB degree in Law.

Career
He was the co-founder, with his brother Aristos Constantinou, of the Ariella fashion label. He took on the sole management of the business after his brother was murdered in the early hours of New Year's Day 1985 at his home in The Bishops Avenue, Hampstead, London.

See also
CWM FX

References

1948 births
Businesspeople from London
Living people
Alumni of King's College London
Cypriot emigrants to England
English people of Greek Cypriot descent
People from Southgate, London